Lochgarry may refer to:
SS Lochgarry, Merchant ship sunk in 1942
Loch Garry, Scottish loch